Sir Luigi Camilleri was the chief justice of Malta from 1952 to 1957.

References 

Maltese knights
20th-century Maltese judges

1892 births
1989 deaths